Teuvo Kalevi Kohonen (11 July 1934 – 13 December 2021) was a Finnish computer scientist. He was professor emeritus of the Academy of Finland.

Career 
Kohonen studied at the Helsinki University of Technology and graduated with a master's degree in engineering in 1957. He received his doctorate in 1962 and stayed at the university with a faculty position until 1993. He was an academy professor of the Academy of Finland between 1975 and 1999.

During most of his career, Kohonen conducted research at Helsinki University of Technology (TKK). The Neural Networks Research Centre of TKK, a center of excellence appointed by Academy of Finland was founded to conduct research related to Kohonen's innovations. After Kohonen's retirement, the center was led by Erkki Oja and later renamed to Adaptive Informatics Research Centre with widened foci of research.

Kohonen made contributions to the field of artificial neural networks, including the Learning Vector Quantization algorithm, fundamental theories of distributed associative memory and optimal associative mappings, the learning subspace method and novel algorithms for symbol processing like redundant hash addressing. He  published several books and over 300 peer-reviewed papers.

Kohonen’s most famous contribution is the self-organizing map or "SOM" (also known as the "Kohonen map" or "Kohonen artificial neural network"; Kohonen himself prefers "SOM"). Due to the popularity of the SOM algorithm in research and in practical applications, Kohonen is often considered to be the most cited Finnish scientist. The current version of the SOM bibliography contains close to 8000 entries.

Kohonen died on 13 December 2021, at the age of 87.

Honors and awards 
Kohonen was elected the First Vice President of the International Association for Pattern Recognition from 1982 to 1984, and acted as the first president of the European Neural Network Society from 1991 to 1992.

For his scientific achievements, Kohonen received a number of prizes including the following:

 IEEE Neural Networks Council Pioneer Award, 1991
 Technical Achievement Award of the IEEE Signal Processing Society, 1995
 IEEE Frank Rosenblatt Award, 2008

Selected publications

References

External links 
 Kohonen, Teuvo (2014): MATLAB Implementations and Applications of the Self-Organizing Map, a text book.
 Interview with Teuvo Kohonen, by CIM Editorial Officer. IEEE Computational Intelligence Magazine, August 2008, Volume 3, Number 3, pages 4–5. 

1934 births
2021 deaths
Academic staff of the Helsinki University of Technology
Finnish computer scientists
Members of the European Academy of Sciences and Arts
Machine learning researchers
Members of the Finnish Academy of Science and Letters
Fellow Members of the IEEE
People from Lauritsala